Allotinus nigritus is a butterfly in the family Lycaenidae. It was described by Georg Semper in 1889. It is found on Mindanao in the Philippines.

References

Butterflies described in 1889
Allotinus
Butterflies of Asia
Taxa named by Georg Semper